William Ponsonby may refer to:

William Ponsonby (publisher) (died 1604), English publisher in the Elizabethan era
William Ponsonby, 2nd Earl of Bessborough (1704–1793), British & Irish MP, Chief Secretary for Ireland, Postmaster-General of Great Britain
William Ponsonby, 1st Baron Ponsonby (1744–1806), Member of Parliament for Bandonbridge and Kilkenny, Postmaster-General of Ireland
William Ponsonby (British Army officer) (1772–1815), British major-general in the Battle of Waterloo, Irish Member of Parliament
William Ponsonby, 1st Baron de Mauley (1787–1855), British Member of Parliament for Poole, Knaresborough and Dorset
William Ponsonby, 1st Viscount Duncannon (1659–1724), Anglo-Irish peer